FC Vorskla Poltava (Ukrainian: ФК «Во́рскла» Полта́ва) is a professional football team which plays in the Ukrainian Premier League and represents the city of Poltava. During the 2014/15 campaign they will compete in the Ukrainian Premier League and Ukrainian Cup.

Competitions

Premier League

League table

Matches

External links
Official website

FC Vorskla Poltava seasons
Vorskla Poltava